Dominic Parker (born July 1964), from Westbere, is an English television personality. He was a cast member on Gogglebox with his wife Stephanie from 2013 to 2016, and in 2023, for the show’s 10th anniversary special. He also participated in the second series of The Jump. He lives in Sandwich, Kent. He is known as 'The Arctic Fox'. He suffered concussion while filming The Jump. He participated on the Channel 4 'catch me if you can'-style show Hunted with his wife, Stephanie. He used to own a Grade I listed house in Kent,The Salutation, designed by Edwin Lutyens. Dom and Steph ran it as a bed and breakfast, The Salutation went into liquidation in 2021, speaking about the liquidation Dom said that he wanted to sell the estate anyway as he and his wife Steph ‘don’t have the energy to run it anymore’. It featured in Channel 4's "Four in a Bed". Steph and Dom now reside in the Canary Islands.  In 2019, Parker appeared as a contestant in Celebrity Masterchef.

References

External links

Living people
Participants in British reality television series
People from Sandwich, Kent
1964 births
Date of birth missing (living people)